Mörsfeld is a municipality in the Donnersbergkreis district, in Rhineland-Palatinate, Germany.

History 
The area which is now Mörsfeld was originally settled at the end of the 9th century. It was supposedly named after a settler named Moro with the oldest recorded spelling of the town as "Morßfelt." About 1 km from the town itself is a place called the Daimbacherhof; a Cistercian monastery was founded there in the 13th century. In 1525, during the Peasants' War, the town as well as the monastery were destroyed. Also in the Daimbacherhof were mercury mines which were mined successfully until the early 19th century with production only being brought to a halt during the Thirty Years' War. Mörsfeld was further ravaged during a period of war from 1792 to 1801. The town was occupied by the French in 1799 and remained in their control til 1814, when it was reincorporated into the Kingdom of Bavaria.

Politics
List of mayors:
 1660–1689, Johannes Wagner
 1690–1719, Johann Jost Pfannkuchen
 1794–1798, Heinrich Kaufhold
 1798–1800, Johann Daniel Orschiedt
 1811–1819, Johann Adam Lied 
 1819–1837, Karl Philipp Grieß
 1837–1838, Johannes Nussbickel
 1838–1848, Jacob Vogel
 1848–1868, Johann Adam Wagner
 1868–1889, Johannes Lawall
 1890–1892, Adam Fellenberger
 1892–1894, Philipp Jakob Vogel
 1895–1915, Philipp Jakob Lawall
 1974–1981, Julius Konrad

References

Municipalities in Rhineland-Palatinate
Donnersbergkreis